WKXG (92.7 MHz) is an FM radio station licensed to serve the community of Moorhead, Mississippi, and broadcasting to the Moorhead/Greenwood area. The station is owned by Delta Radio Network, through licensee Contemporary Communications LLC. It airs a country music format.

The station was assigned the WMYQ call letters by the Federal Communications Commission on August 17, 2016.

In 2018, the station hired David Mueller, performing under the name Stonewall Jackson, who lost a civil lawsuit for sexual assault against Taylor Swift. The move was met with significant backlash from Swift fans.

The station changed its call sign to WKXG on November 14, 2022.

References

External links
 Official Website
 

KXG
Radio stations established in 2017
2017 establishments in Mississippi
Country radio stations in the United States
Sunflower County, Mississippi